McElroy Creek is a tributary of Middle Island Creek,  long, in northern West Virginia in the United States.

Geography
McElroy Creek is formed near the unincorporated community of Center Point in northern Doddridge County by the confluence of two streams:
A short distance downstream of this confluence, it collects a third significant headwaters tributary, the Talkington Fork.

From Center Point, McElroy Creek flows generally westward into eastern Tyler County, through the unincorporated community of Ashley in Doddridge County and the unincorporated communities of Little Pittsburg and Shirley in Tyler County, collecting Flint Run, its largest tributary, on the boundary of Doddridge and Tyler Counties.  It flows into Middle Island Creek from the east, a short distance southwest of the community of Tyler.  The creek is paralleled by West Virginia Route 23 for most of its course.

According to the Geographic Names Information System, the creek has also been known historically by the spelling "McElroys Creek."

History
The earliest white settler on McElroy Creek — and its namesake — was John McElroy who was killed by Indians near where it discharges into Middle Island Creek. This was likely in the early 1790s, as the natives had effectively been expelled by 1795. The "Three Forks of McElroy Creek" (near present Center Point) were first settled in 1812 by brothers Joshua Allen (1787-1867) and Israel Allen (1792-1853). This was then in District 19 of Harrison (later Doddridge) County. The district was renamed McClellan District after the American Civil War.

See also
List of rivers of West Virginia
Center Point Covered Bridge

References 

Rivers of West Virginia
Rivers of Tyler County, West Virginia
Rivers of Doddridge County, West Virginia